The Battle of Ticinum, or Battle of Pavia, was fought in 271 near Ticinum (Pavia) in Italy, and resulted in the emperor Aurelian destroying the retreating Juthungi army.

Background
In 271, the Juthungi invaded Roman Italy. They defeated Aurelian's army at the Battle of Placentia but, on their way to attack the defenseless city of Rome, they were repulsed by the imperial army at the Battle of Fano. The Juthungi then asked for peace but Aurelian rejected their demand for safe passage. Trying to force their way back to their homelands, they headed north using the Via Aemilia. Aurelian wanted a decisive victory in order to restore his damaged reputation after the loss at Placentia as well as to recover the plunder the Juthungi were carrying. Therefore, he went in pursuit of the invaders, waiting for the best moment to attack.

The battle
Aurelian attacked the Juthungi while they were entering the open plains near Ticinum (Pavia). He was able to destroy their entire force, except for a column that escaped through the Alps. However, this remnant force was later caught by Aurelian in Raetia and was eliminated.

Aftermath
For the victory, Aurelian assumed the title of honour Germanicus Maximus. His victories ended the Juthungi invasion, but the Roman citizenry were shocked by the great threat that Rome itself had faced after the loss near Placentia. However, the menace of the Germanic people and a Germanic invasion was still perceived by the Romans as likely. In response, Aurelian resolved to build a new system of walls around Rome that became known as the Aurelian Walls. Portions of this wall can still be seen in Rome today.

References

Bibliography
 

Pavia
Pavia
Pavia 271
Pavia
Pavia 271
Pavia
Pavia 271
Pavia
Pavia
Aurelian